The 2022 EchoPark Texas Grand Prix was a NASCAR Cup Series race held on March 27, 2022, at Circuit of the Americas in Austin, Texas. Contested on the 3.426-mile (5.514 km) road course over 69 laps, extended from 68 laps due to an overtime finish, it was the sixth race of the 2022 NASCAR Cup Series season. Ross Chastain, of Trackhouse Racing, won the race to secure his first career NASCAR Cup Series victory, and Trackhouse' first win in NASCAR.

Report

Background

Circuit of the Americas (COTA) is a grade 1 FIA-specification motorsports facility located within the extraterritorial jurisdiction of Austin, Texas. It features a  road racing circuit.  The facility is home to the Formula One United States Grand Prix, and the Motorcycle Grand Prix of the Americas, a round of the FIM Road Racing World Championship. It previously hosted the Supercars Championship, the FIA World Endurance Championship, the IMSA SportsCar Championship, and IndyCar Series.

Entry list
 (R) denotes rookie driver.
 (i) denotes driver who is ineligible for series driver points.

Practice

Practice results

Qualifying
Under a 2021 rule change, the timing line in road course qualifying is not the start-finish line. Instead, the timing line for qualifying will be set at the exit of Istanbul 8.

Qualifying results

Race

Stage Results

Stage One
Laps: 15

Stage Two
Laps: 17

Final Stage Results

Stage Three
Laps: 38

Race statistics
 Lead changes: 13 among 9 different drivers
 Cautions/Laps: 9 for 13
 Red flags: 0
 Time of race: 3 hours, 20 minutes and 57 seconds
 Average speed:

Media

Television
Fox Sports covered the race on the television side. Mike Joy, Clint Bowyer, and three-time NASCAR Cup Series champion and co-owner of Stewart-Haas Racing Tony Stewart called the race from the broadcast booth. Jamie Little and Regan Smith handled pit road for the television side, and Larry McReynolds provided insight from the Fox Sports studio in Charlotte.

Radio
PRN had the radio call for the race which was simulcasted on Sirius XM NASCAR Radio.

Standings after the race

Drivers' Championship standings

Manufacturers' Championship standings

Note: Only the first 16 positions are included for the driver standings.

References

Texas Grand Prix
Circuit of the Americas
Texas Grand Prix
NASCAR races at Circuit of the Americas
Texas Grand Prix